Cleanability is a term used in clean productions (e.g. to assess the cleanability of technical surfaces).

Description
In order to ensure optimum cleanability of the surfaces of machines and equipment, they must fulfil certain requirements. Where surfaces come into contact with media, no deposits may be formed which could impair product quality. Therefore, the surface roughness of such areas should be below 0.8 µm (see EHEDG doc. 8). If the degree of roughness is exceeded, resistances may develop during disinfection processes. These occur when microorganisms only come into contact with disinfectants but are not killed by them.

When ascertaining the cleanability of a surface with regard to particles, the analysis can be carried out in correlation with the surface cleanliness classes described in VDI 2083 Part 9.1. Surface roughness can be measured, for example, using profile methods (DIN EN ISO 11562) or AFM (atomic force microscope). However, no norm is currently in existence which describes a standardised AFM procedure.

References

Cleaning
Industrial processes
Hygiene